Marshal Stanisław Małachowski High School is a school in Płock and the oldest school in Poland. Its roots go back to 1180. It is now a general education high school. It was named after the Polish statesman Stanisław Małachowski.

See also
 List of Jesuit sites

References

High schools in Poland
Buildings and structures in Płock
12th-century establishments in Poland
1180 establishments in Europe
Educational institutions established in the 12th century